The men's 110 metres hurdles event was part of the track and field athletics programme at the 1920 Summer Olympics. The competition was held on Tuesday, August 17, 1920, and on Wednesday, August 18, 1920. 24 runners from 15 nations competed. No nation had more than 4 runners, suggesting the limit had been reduced from the 12 maximum in force in 1908 and 1912. The event was won by Earl Thomson of Canada in world record time, the first victory by any nation other than the United States in the men's 110 metres hurdles and the first time that any non-U.S. nation had even been on the podium since 1896. Thomson, who had lived in the United States since age 8, had wanted to run for the U.S. team but was ineligible due to his Canadian citizenship. A British flag was displayed at the medal ceremony rather than a Canadian one because the organizing officials did not have the appropriate flag.

Background

This was the sixth appearance of the event, which is one of 12 athletics events to have been held at every Summer Olympics. None of the finalists from the pre-war 1912 Games returned. Earl Thomson of Canada was a heavy favorite; he had won the 1920 AAU championship, IC4A championship (120 yards, in a world record 14.4 seconds), and Canadian Olympic trials.

Czechoslovakia, Denmark, the Netherlands, New Zealand, and Switzerland each made their first appearance in the event. The United States made its sixth appearance, the only nation to have competed in the 110 metres hurdles in each Games to that point.

Competition format

The competition used the three-round basic format introduced in 1908, though the effectiveness of the first round in narrowing the field was dramatically increased compared to 1908 and 1912. The first round consisted of six heats, with between 3 and 5 hurdlers each. The top two hurdlers in each heat advanced to the semifinals. The 12 semifinalists were divided into two semifinals of 6 runners each; the top three hurdlers in each advanced to the 6-man final.

Records

These were the standing world and Olympic records (in seconds) prior to the 1920 Summer Olympics.

In the semifinals, Harold Barron and Earl Thomson equalled the world record with 15.0 seconds. In the final, Earl Thomson set a new world record with 14.8 seconds.

Schedule

Results

Quarterfinals

Quarterfinal 1

Quarterfinal 2

Quarterfinal 3

Quarterfinal 4

Quarterfinal 5

Quarterfinal 6

Semifinals

Semifinal 1

Semifinal 2

Final

The final was held on Wednesday, August 18, 1920.

References

Notes
 
 

Hurdles 110 metre
Sprint hurdles at the Olympics